Telamona excelsa is a species of treehopper in the family Membracidae.

References

Further reading

External links

 

Smiliinae